This is a list of people who were, are, or have been prominent conservationists. Environmentalists would also work on conservation issues.

List of conservationists

A
 Edward Abbey – writer and wilderness activist 
 Ansel Adams – wilderness and landscape photographer 
 Anthony Ashley-Cooper, 10th Earl of Shaftesbury – former president of Sir David Attenborough's British Butterfly Conservation Society 
 Damian Aspinall – chairman of The Aspinall Foundation 
 David Attenborough  – host of many BBC Natural History documentaries, naturalist, educator

B
 Jeannie Baker – artist/author of children's picture books and film maker 
 Nena Baltazar – President of Comunidad Inti Wara Yassi, a Bolivian nongovernmental organization working in conservation and wildlife care 
 S. Theodore Baskaran – wildlife conservationist 
 Tom Bell – founder of the Wyoming Outdoor Council and decorated World War II veteran 
 Frances Beinecke – President of the Natural Resources Defense Council 
 Harvey Broome – wilderness activist 
 David Brower – mid-20th century leader of the Sierra Club 
 Tom Brown – naturalist
 David Bellamy – botanist and environmental campaigner

C
 Arthur Carhart – U.S. Forest Service official who inspired wilderness protection in the United States 
 Archie Carr – zoology professor and herpetologist, prominent sea turtle conservationist 
 Rachel Carson – scientist who advanced the global environmental movement 
 Jimmy Carter – signed the Alaska National Interest Lands Conservation Act in 1980, which protected more land than any single piece of legislation ever passed by Congress 
 Yvon Chouinard – environmentalist and outdoor industry businessman. Owner of the company Patagonia, known for its environmental focus. 
 Frederic Edwin Church – American landscape painter, famous for Twilight in the Wilderness 
 Eugenie Clark – conservationist of sharks 
 Clem Coetzee – (c. 1939–7 September 2006) Zimbabwean conservationist. He developed new methods of big game conservation. 
 Ernie Cooper – Canadian wildlife trade expert 
 Jeff Corwin – Animal Planet host, herpetologist 
 Adjany Costa – Angolan marine biologist 
 Jacques Cousteau – oceanographer, marine biologist
 Cynthia Mbabazi – advocate, researcher

D
 Marjory Stoneman Douglas – writer/conservationist who founded Friends of the Everglades

 William O. Douglas – U.S. Supreme Court Justice who was an ardent conservationist. William O. Douglas Wilderness is named after him
 Iain Douglas-Hamilton – founder of Save the Elephants, zoologist 
 Gerald Durrell – naturalist, zookeeper, conservationist, writer, television presenter, founder of the Jersey Wildlife Conservation Trust (now Durrell Wildlife Conservation Trust) and the Jersey Zoo (now renamed Durrell Wildlife Park)

E
 Dwight D. Eisenhower – the Arctic National Wildlife Refuge became a federally protected wilderness area during his administration 
 Ralph Waldo Emerson – author, naturalist, wilderness adventurer, activist and development critic

F
 Dian Fossey – primatologist known for studying gorillas, author, founder of the Digit Fund today known as the Dian Fossey Gorilla Fund International, was murdered presumably by poachers because of her cause 
 Bernard Frank – one of the founders of The Wilderness Society

G
 Jane Goodall – primatologist known for studying chimpanzees, author, founder of the Jane Goodall Institute 
 George Bird Grinnell – prominent early American conservationist
 Bernhard Grzimek – renowned German zoo director and animal conservationist in postwar West Germany.
 Madison Grant – American creator of wildlife management and co-founder of Save the Redwoods League

H
 Hubert Humphrey – U.S. Senator from Minnesota in 1956 who presented the first draft of the Federal Wilderness Preservation System Bill to Congress 
 Celia Hunter – former president of The Wilderness Society

I
 Steve Irwin – Australian zookeeper, documentary film maker and activist

L
 Lyndon Baines Johnson – signed the Wilderness Act on September 3, 1964, which permanently guaranteed millions of acres of wild land for future generations of Americans 
 Aldo Leopold – ecologist, forester and environmentalist; author of A Sand County Almanac 
 A. Starker Leopold – son of Aldo Leopold, zoologist and ecologist, writer of the Leopold Report

M
 Wangari Muta Maathai – Nobel Peace Prize recipient, founder of the Green Belt Movement, political activist 
 Benton MacKaye – wilderness activist, founder of the Appalachian Trail 
 Bob Marshall – principal founder of The Wilderness Society 
 Louis B. Marshall – constitutional lawyer who was instrumental in passing "forever wild" legislation of N.Y.S. Constitution, which permanently protected wilderness in Adirondack and Catskill Forest Preserves 
 Nigel Marven – wildlife presenter and producer 
 Bill Mason – wilderness author and canoeist 
 Stephen Mather – conservationist who was the first director of National Park Service, as a unified federal agency to oversee National Parks administration which he ran publicity campaign to established 
 Malcolm McCallum – conservation biologist who publishes on biodiversity and extinction, and established the scholarly journal Herpetological Conservation and Biology. 
 Ian McTaggart-Cowan – Canadian zoologist, conservationist and television presenter
 Rodrigo Medellín – Mexican ecologist and academic
 Betty Leslie-Melville – American born writer, who along with her husband Jock Leslie-Melvile, is known for authoring ten books on conservation topics, protecting the Rothschild's giraffe in Kenya, and founding the Giraffe Centre in Lang'ata, Kenya.
 Chico Mendes – Brazilian environmentalist
 Sergio Rossetti Morosini – Brazilian-American environmentalist
 Cynthia Moss – elephant behavioural specialist, ethologist, author 
 John Muir – author and preservationist, founder of the Sierra Club 
 Margaret Murie – "Grandmother of the conservation movement" 
 Olaus Murie – wilderness activist
 Erni Suyanti Musabine, veterinarian involved in the conservation of Sumatran tigers

N
 Abi Kusno Nachran – Indonesian rain forest preservation activist 
 Roderick Nash – author of "Wilderness and the American Mind" 
 Lone Drøscher Nielsen – working with Borneo Orangutan Survival for conservation of Bornean orangutans and orangutan habitat
 Henri Nsanjama – Malawian conservationist
 Aletris Neils – carnivore conservationist and executive director of Conservation CATalyst

O
 Ric O'Barry – former dolphin trainer for the TV show Flipper turned dolphin activist and conservationist, featured in the documentary The Cove 
 Ernest Oberholtzer – one of the eight founders of The Wilderness Society 
 Sigurd F. Olson – author, environmentalist, teacher, canoeist and advocate in the northern Midwest. Worked to establish Pt. Reyes, Arctic NWR, Boundary Waters Canoe Wilderness

P
 Deborah Parker – indigenous rights activist, conservationist, and environmentalist who has opposed various pipeline projects and who advocates for protecting coastal waters and salmon among the Northwest Natives
 Gifford Pinchot – conservationist, first Chief of the United States Forest Service
 Sharon Pincott – naturalist, wildlife conservationist, elephant behavioural specialist, author 
 Ian Player – international conservationist 
 Carl Pope – executive director of the Sierra Club

R
 Alan Rabinowitz – President and CEO of Panthera Corporation, a conservation organization devoted to protecting the world's 36 cat species 
 Phil Radford – environmental, clean energy, and democracy leader, director of Greenpeace 
 Bradbury Robinson – medical doctor and conservationist who published warnings in the 1940s against the use of DDT in agricultural 
 Theodore Roosevelt – set aside  of federal land for national parks and nature preserves. He was also instrumental in establishing the United States Forest Service

S
 Peter Scott – (1909–1989) founder of the World Wildlife Fund and Wildfowl & Wetlands Trust and the first conservationist to be knighted (in 1973) 
 Charles Alexander Sheldon – the "Father of Denali National Park" 
 Willie Smits – working, with Borneo Orangutan Survival for conservation of Bornean orangutans and orangutan habitat
 Michael Soulé – (1936–2020) father of conservation biology; cofounder and first president of the Society for Conservation Biology
 Austin Stevens – naturalist, herpetologist, wildlife photographer, documentarian, television personality, and author

T
 Gary Tabor – founder and director of Center for Large Landscape Conservation 
 Doug Tompkins and Kristine Tompkins – entrepreneurs turned conservationists; together have protected  in Chile and Argentina 
 Henry David Thoreau – author, naturalist and development critic
 Timothy Treadwell – documentary filmmaker, naturalist and founder of the bear-protection organization "Grizzly People"

U
 Stewart Udall – United States Secretary of the Interior when the Wilderness Act was signed into law by President Lyndon B. Johnson in 1964

V
 Lily Venizelos – Greek conservationist
 Marlice van Vuuren – conservationist and broadcaster

W
Eric Wikramanayake
 Paul Watson – founder of the Sea Shepherd Conservation Society, a co-founder of Greenpeace, and the star of the television show Whale Wars on Animal Planet that documents his organization's yearly trip to the southern ocean to disrupt the illegal activities of Japanese Whalers/ICR. 
 Robert K. Watson – founder and father of LEED Leadership in Energy and Environmental Design 
 David B. Wingate – saved the Bermuda petrel, or cahow, from extinction and almost single-handedly returned 15-acre Nonsuch Island, in Bermuda, to its precolonial state
 E.O. Wilson – Pelligrino University Professor at Harvard University, for introducing the concept of Biophilia and making many other contributions to environmental science

Y
 Robert Sterling Yard – founding member of The Wilderness Society

Z
 Howard Zahniser – leader of The Wilderness Society, drafted the Wilderness Act

See also
List of conservation issues
Environmentalism

References 

 
Conservationists